Pokrzywno  is a village in the administrative district of Gmina Trzcianka, within Czarnków-Trzcianka County, Greater Poland Voivodeship, in west-central Poland.

The village has a population of 220.

References

Pokrzywno

The village has a population of 221.